Love Is Everything  may refer to:

Albums 
Love Is Everything (Johnny Mathis album), 1965
Love Is Everything: The Jane Siberry Anthology, 2002, or the title track by Jane Siberry
Love Is Everything (George Strait album), 2013, or the title track

Songs 
"Love Is Everything" (song), 2013, by Ariana Grande
"Love Is Everything", a 1958 song by Carl Dobkins, Jr. With The Seniors
"Love Is Everything", a 1978 single by Golden Harvest

See also
Everything is Love, a 2018 album by The Carters (Beyoncé and Jay-Z)